Antwi is a surname. Notable people with the surname include:

Akwasi Antwi (born 1985), Canadian football player
Christopher Antwi-Adjei (born 1994), Ghanaian footballer
Clinton Antwi (born 1999), Ghanaian footballer
Denny Antwi (born 1993), Ghanaian footballer
Emmanuel Antwi (born 1996), Ghanaian footballer
Ernest Antwi (born 1995), Ghanaian footballer
Eugene Boakye Antwi (born 1970), Ghanaian politician
Godwin Antwi (born 1988), Ghanaian-Spanish footballer
Jayden Antwi (born 1998), English footballer
John Antwi (born 1992), Ghanaian footballer
John Asare-Antwi (born 1935), Ghanaian sprinter
Kojo Antwi, Ghanaian musician
Kwame Anyimadu-Antwi (born 1962), Ghanaian politician
Matthew Kwaku Antwi (born 1941), Ghanaian politician
Nana Antwi Manu (born 1994), Ghanaian footballer
Patrick Antwi (born 1987), Ghanaian footballer
Rodney Antwi (born 1995), Dutch footballer
Solomon Kojo Antwi (born 2000), Ghanaian footballer
Will Antwi (born 1982), Anglo-Ghanaian footballer
Yaw Antwi (born 1985), Ghanaian footballer

Ghanaian surnames